The 108th Infantry Division (108. Infanterie-Division) was a formation of the Imperial German Army in World War I.  The division was formed in May 1915 as "Division Beckmann" (named for its commander, Max Beckmann) and became the 108th Infantry Division on November 7, 1915.  It was part of a wave of new infantry divisions formed in 1915.  The division was disbanded in September 1918 and its assets distributed to other units.

The division was formed primarily from the excess infantry regiments of existing divisions which were being triangularized.  The division's 97th Infantry Regiment came from the 42nd Infantry Division; the 137th Infantry Regiment came from the 31st Infantry Division; and the 265th Reserve Infantry Regiment came from the 80th Reserve Division.

Combat chronicle
The 108th Infantry Division initially served on the Eastern Front, serving in the Baltic region until June 1916.  It then went south to the front in Ukraine on the Styr River where it faced the Brusilov Offensive and then remained in the line until the armistice on the Eastern Front in December 1917.  The division was then sent to the Western Front, entering the line north of the Ailette River, where it remained until April 1918.  It then fought in the Somme region until it was dissolved on September 19, 1918.  Allied intelligence rated the division as third class.

Order of battle on formation
The 108th Infantry Division was formed as a triangular division.  The order of battle of the division on October 3, 1915, was as follows:

5. Infanterie-Brigade
1. Oberrheinisches Infanterie-Regiment Nr. 97
2. Unter-Elsässisches Infanterie-Regiment Nr. 137
Reserve-Infanterie-Regiment Nr. 265
Reserve-Dragoner-Regiment Nr. 1
Feldartillerie-Regiment Nr. 243
1. Kompanie/Reserve-Pionier-Bataillon Nr. 1

Late-war order of battle
The division underwent relatively few organizational changes over the course of the war.  Cavalry was reduced, artillery and signals commands were formed, and combat engineer support was expanded to a full pioneer battalion.  The order of battle on April 26, 1918, was as follows:

5. Infanterie-Brigade
1. Oberrheinisches Infanterie-Regiment Nr. 97
2. Unter-Elsässisches Infanterie-Regiment Nr. 137
Reserve-Infanterie-Regiment Nr. 265
6. Eskadron/Braunschweigisches Husaren-Regiment Nr. 17
Artillerie-Kommandeur 29
Feldartillerie-Regiment Nr. 243
II. Bataillon Reserve-Fußartillerie-Regiment Nr. 4 (from May 4, 1918)
Pionier-Bataillon Nr. 108
1. Reserve-Kompanie/Pionier-Bataillon Nr. 1
1. Reserve-Kompanie/Pionier-Bataillon Nr. 33
Minenwerfer-Kompanie Nr. 108
Divisions-Nachrichten-Kommandeur 108

References
 108. Infanterie-Division (Chronik 1915/1918) - Der erste Weltkrieg
 Division Beckmann (Chronik 1915) - Der erste Weltkrieg
 Hermann Cron et al., Ruhmeshalle unserer alten Armee (Berlin, 1935)
 Hermann Cron, Geschichte des deutschen Heeres im Weltkriege 1914-1918 (Berlin, 1937)
 Günter Wegner, Stellenbesetzung der deutschen Heere 1825-1939. (Biblio Verlag, Osnabrück, 1993), Bd. 1
 Histories of Two Hundred and Fifty-One Divisions of the German Army which Participated in the War (1914-1918), compiled from records of Intelligence section of the General Staff, American Expeditionary Forces, at General Headquarters, Chaumont, France 1919 (1920)

Notes

Infantry divisions of Germany in World War I
Military units and formations established in 1915
Military units and formations disestablished in 1918
1915 establishments in Germany